Jennifer Christine Fichter (born December 8, 1984) is an American former English teacher who was convicted in Polk County, Florida, United States in 2015 of sexual battery against three 17-year-old male students. She was sentenced to 22 years imprisonment.

Early life and career 
Jennifer Fichter was born on December 8, 1984, and graduated from Paxon School for Advanced Studies in Jacksonville, Florida in June 2003. She then attended the University of Florida from August 2003 to December 2006 earning a Bachelor of Arts Degree majoring in English. She held instructional teaching positions at Robinswood Middle School, Orange County, Florida from August 13, 2007, to December 19, 2008, when she resigned pending the outcome an investigation for alleged offenses of inappropriate behavior.

Sexual abuse, trial, and sentencing

Fichter was hired as an English teacher at Kathleen High School on August 29, 2011, and was paid US$40,530 per year. The Central Florida Aerospace Academy is a career academy of Kathleen High and holds classes at Lakeland Linder International Airport. Fichter was fired by the Polk County School Board on April 22, 2014, after her arrest for sexual relationships with three of her male students, all 17 years old, more than 37 times between August 2012 and April 2014.

As of June 7, 2014 Fichter was being held in the Polk County Jail with a bond set at US$520,000. Fichter was convicted and, on July 2, 2015, was sentenced to 22 years' imprisonment. A Polk County judge called her a predator during sentencing. The sentencing by Judge Glenn T. Shelby was immediately controversial, with the unusually long sentence being reviled by many, especially in Europe.
Fichter is currently imprisoned in Gadsden Correctional Facility and is scheduled for release on January 19, 2035.

See also 
 Cougar (slang)
 Hebephilia
 Sexual harassment in education
 Statutory rape#Female-male statutory rape
 Debra Lafave
 Mary Kay Letourneau
 Pamela Joan Rogers

References 

1984 births
Living people
Sex and the law
Schoolteachers from Florida
American women educators
Place of birth missing (living people)
School sexual abuse scandals
21st-century American criminals
American female criminals
People convicted of statutory rape offenses
University of Florida alumni
21st-century American women
American people convicted of child sexual abuse
American rapists